Liometopum microcephalum is a species of ant in the genus Liometopum. Described by Panzer in 1798, the species is endemic to Europe.

References

Dolichoderinae
Insects described in 1798
Hymenoptera of Europe